Pinotepa may refer to:

Languages
Pinotepa Mixtec, a Mixtec language of southern Oaxaca

Places
 Mexico: 
Pinotepa Nacional, Oaxaca
Pinotepa de Don Luis, Oaxaca